Jeremy Adelman (born 1960) is the Henry Charles Lea Professor of History at Princeton University, Princeton, New Jersey, USA, where he is also the director of the Global History Lab.  Previously, he served as the director of the Council for International Teaching and Research, the director of the Program in Latin American Studies and chair of the History Department at Princeton.  His areas of scholarship include Latin American and global history.

He has taught at Oxford University and the University of Essex in England, the Instituto Torcuato di Tella in Argentina, and at Princeton since 1992, and has held visiting fellowships at the Institute for Advanced Study (Princeton) and the Institut d'études politiques (Paris), the École des hautes études en sciences sociales (Paris), and the Institute for Human Sciences (Vienna).  His current initiatives include the formation of the Global History Collaborative with colleagues in Berlin, Paris, and Tokyo.  Adelman is currently working on two books, a history of global interdependence since the 1840s and a general history of Latin America.

His awards include the John Simon Guggenheim Memorial Fellowship and the Frederick Burkhardt Fellowship of the American Council for Learned Societies.

Adelman is also committed to creating and supporting connected and inclusive learning in fractured societies.  He has written and presented courses in global history on various platforms, Coursera, NovoEd, and EdX under the Global History Lab.  The initiative branched in September 2016, in collaboration with colleagues at the University of Geneva, to outreach programs to refugees in Kenya, Jordan, Rwanda and Uganda. The GHL now integrates a full-year curriculum of three courses in global history, oral history and documentary methods, and supervised research projects for students worldwide.  In 2020, it ceased to be a MOOC and became a network program shared across 25 institutions (universities, NGO's, foundations, and civic activist groups) in 23 countries.  Tens of thousands of students have completed GHL courses from Vietnam, Bangladesh, and Germany to Colombia, Greece and Nigeria.

Student work is being published on the site Global History Dialogues.<Homepage>

Education
Adelman was educated at University of Toronto, the London School of Economics, and the University of Oxford.

Works

Republic of Capital: Buenos Aires and the Legal Transformation of the Atlantic World (Stanford University Press: Stanford, 1999)  Winner, American Historical Association James A. Rawley Prize for the best book in Atlantic History
Sovereignty and Revolution in the Iberian Atlantic (Princeton University Press: Princeton, 2006) 
Co-authored, World Together, Worlds Apart: An Introduction to World History From the Beginnings of Humankind to the Present 3rd Edition (New York: W. W. Norton, 2010) 
 Worldly Philosopher: The Odyssey of Albert O. Hirschman Princeton University Press, Princeton, NJ  (2013) .
El idealista prágmatico: La odisea de Alberto O. Hirschman. Ediciones Uniandes (March 1, 2017)
The Essential Hirschman (ed.). Princeton University Press 2015 
Colonial Legacies: The Problem of Persistence in Latin American History (ed.) Routledge 1999. 
 Co-edited with Stephen Aron, Trading Cultures: The Worlds of Western Merchants. (Brepols, 2001).  
Los años del daguerrotipo: Primeras fotografías argentinas, 1843-1870. (with Miguel Angel Cuarterolo. Fundación Antorchas 1995. Spanish and English.
Essays in Argentine Labour History, 1870-1930. Palgrave MacMillan 1992.

Critical studies and reviews of Adelman's work
 Reviews of  Worldly philosopher and The essential Hirschman.

External links
 Princeton University website
 Global History Lab
 Homepage

References

Princeton University faculty
University of Toronto alumni
Latin Americanists
Historians of Latin America
ACLS Fellows
1960 births
Living people